Alhambra Publishing is a Swedish publishing house established in 1986 to publish Swedish translations of Arabic classic and contemporary literature. Examples include translations of Ibn Khaldun's 14th-century Prolegomena, and of novels by Naguib Mahfouz. Alhambra's ambition "to show solidarity between all human cultures" has led it to also publish Swedish translations from other cultures, including China and Latin America. In addition, it established in the 1990s a popular science series, the "Alhambra pocket encyclopedia", comprising 85 titles by 2011.

Alhambra Publishing takes its name from the Alhambra in Spain.

Writers

Adonis
Machado de Assis
Hesham Bahari
Albert Cossery
Stig Dalager
Ninar Esber
Khalil Gibran
Zeina Ghandour
Shusha Guppy
Frank Heller
Sonallah Ibrahim
Elias Khoury
Ibrahim al-Koni
Raouf Masaad
Naguib Mahfouz
Ibn al-Muqaffa
Álvaro Mutis
Nabil Naoum
Rumi
Hanan al-Shaykh
Samuel Shimon
Muhammed Shukri
Ahdaf Soueif
Torbjörn Säfve
René Vázquez Díaz
Jules Verne
Najem Wali
Washington Irving

References

External links
 www.alhambra.se

Book publishing companies of Sweden
Publishing companies established in 1986
1986 establishments in Sweden